İsmil is a town in Konya Province, Turkey.

Geography

İsmil is a town in Karatay district. (Karatay is an intracity district of Greater Konya.) It is a few kilometers south of the Turkish state highway  which connects Konya to Adana. The population is 6215 as of 2011

History

The first mention of İsmil in historical records was in the 15th century with reference to the farm of İsmil. The farm was owned by a certain İsmail of Khorasan indicating that the original population of the settlement was Turkmens from Khorasan. 
In the 17th century there is another record about the marsh area around İsmil. In 1956 İsmil was declared a seat of township.

Economy
Wheat and sugar beet are the main crops of the town. The town also expects revenue from thermal springs around the town when the accommodation infrastructure, now under construction,  will be completed.

References

Populated places in Konya Province
Towns in Turkey
Karatay District